C. tropicalis  may refer to:
 Caenorhabditis tropicalis, a species of nematodes
 Candida tropicalis, a yeast species
 Cryptotis tropicalis, the tropical small-eared shrew, a very small mammal species found in Mexico, Belize and Guatemala

See also